Observation Hill may refer to:

 Observation Hill (Somaliland)
 Observation Hill (McMurdo Station), Antarctica